Aste-Béon is a commune in the Pyrénées-Atlantiques department in the Nouvelle-Aquitaine region of south-western France.

The inhabitants of the commune are known as Astois et Béonais or Astoises et Béonaises.

Geography
Aste-Béon is located in the heart of the Ossau Valley some 33 km south-east of Oloron-Sainte-Marie and 7 km north of Laruns. Access to the commune is by road D240 from Castet in the north passing south down the valley in the west of the commune through the village and continuing to Béost in the south. The D290 connects the village of Béon in the north-east to the D934 road which runs from north to south parallel to the commune's western border. Most of the commune is rugged mountains with substantial forests except for a narrow strip down the western side of the commune in the Ossau Valley where there is farmland.

The Gave d'Ossau forms most of the western border of the commune as it flows north down the Ossau Valley eventually joining the Gave d'Aspe at Oloron-Sainte-Marie. The Lamay river rises in the east of the commune and flows west to join the Gave d'Ossau just south of the village.
The Arrigast flows into the Gave d'Ossau from the left bank forming the northern border of the commune on that side of the river.

Places and hamlets

 Grange l'Art
 Aste
 Béon
 Boala d'Aste
 Grange Borie
 Chiperne
 La Coumète
 Le Coutchet
 Dès (Barns)
 Le Génébra
 Grange Lavigne
 Lourziou
 Grange Loustalet
 Grange d'Ourdou
 Peyraube (Forest)
 Le Port d'Aste
 Le Port de Béon
 Pourteig
 Grange Salle
 Le Sarrat
 Serres
 Sers

Neighbouring communes and villages

Toponymy

The commune name in béarnais is Asta-Bion.

Michel Grosclaude said that the name Aste comes from the basque aitz/as ("rocky point"). He suggested that the name Béon comes from the pre-indo-European oronymic root *ben

The following table details the origins of the commune name and other names in the commune.

Sources:

Raymond: Topographic Dictionary of the Department of Basses-Pyrenees, 1863, on the page numbers indicated in the table. 
Grosclaude: Toponymic Dictionary of communes, Béarn, 2006 
Ossau: Notaries of Ossau
Val de Tena: Treaty of Ossau - Val de Tena
Luntz: Contracts of Luntz
Carresse: Contracts of Carresse
Insinuations: Insinuations of the Diocese of Oloron 
Denombrement: Denombremont of Aste
Cassini Map: Cassini Map from 1750

History
In 1385 Aste had 18 fires and depended on the bailiwick of Ossau. In the same year Béon also had 18 fires and belonged to the same bailiwick. The fief of Béon depended on the Viscounts of Béarn.

Administration

List of Successive Mayors

Inter-communality
The commune is part of three inter-communal structures:
 the Communauté de communes de la Vallée d'Ossau;
 the SIVU for the construction of the Retirement home in Haut-Ossau;
 the joint association of Haut-Béarn;

The commune is part of the Pays d'Oloron et du Haut-Béarn.

Demography
In 2017 the commune had 237 inhabitants.

Economy
The economy of the commune has historically been orientated towards agriculture and livestock. The commune is part of the Appellation d'origine contrôlée (AOC) zone of Ossau-iraty.

In 1769, Jean-Joseph d'Augerot, Chief Justice of the Parliament of Navarre built a foundry in the Ossau Valley at Béon. The foundry used minerals from old mines located at Aste.

Culture and heritage

Civil heritage

The Château of Béon (14th century) was occupied until the 17th century when it was abandoned until the 1980s. It remained the property of the House of Béon for all its history until its slow extinction in the 19th century. It is registered as a historical monument and has been completely restored.

Religious heritage
The Church of Saint John the Baptist (19th century) at Aste is registered as a historical monument.

It contains a Chalice (1654) which is registered as a historical object.

Environmental heritage
A Natural reserve of nesting vultures was created by a Ministerial Decree of 11 December 1974 and is located across the territoris of Aste-Béon, Bielle, Bilhères, and Castet. The museum which is associated with it, called La Falaise aux Vautours, is at the entrance to the village.

The Pène de Béon is 1,251 metres high.

The commune is traversed from north to south by the GR of Pays du tour de la vallée d'Ossau.

See also
 Ossau Valley
Communes of the Pyrénées-Atlantiques department

External links
The Observatory of La Falaise aux Vautours website 
The foundry of Béon on the Fer et Savoir Faire website 
Aste-Béon on Géoportail, National Geographic Institute (IGN) website 
Aste and Beon on the 1750 Cassini Map

References

Communes of Pyrénées-Atlantiques